Sidney Ramsden (28 March 1901 – 24 March 1975) was an Australian cyclist. He competed in the individual time trial event at the 1924 Summer Olympics.

References

External links
 

1901 births
1975 deaths
Australian male cyclists
Olympic cyclists of Australia
Cyclists at the 1924 Summer Olympics
Cyclists from Melbourne